Thomas J. Hedderson   (May 7, 1954 – August 8, 2022) was a Canadian politician in Newfoundland and Labrador. He was a cabinet minister and served as the Parliamentary Assistant to the Premier of Newfoundland and Labrador, Kathy Dunderdale.

Hedderson represented the district of Harbour Main from 1999 until 2015, being re-elected three times. He previously held the portfolios of Minister of Education, Minister of Tourism, Culture and Recreation, Minister of Intergovernmental Affairs, Transportation and Works, and Minister of Fisheries and Aquaculture. Before entering politics Hedderson worked as a principal.

Hedderson died on August 8, 2022, at the age of 68.

Electoral record 

|-

|-

|-

|NDP
|Fred Akerman
|align="right"|511
|align="right"|7.64%
|align="right"|
|}

|-

|-

|-

|NDP
|Eugene Conway
|align="right"|493
|align="right"|7.31%
|align="right"|
|}

|-

|-

|-
 
|NDP
|Jean Dandenault
|align="right"|323
|align="right"|5.81%
|align="right"|
|}

|-

|-

|NDP
|Mike Maher
|align="right"|987
|align="right"|19.10%
|align="right"|
|-

|}

References

External links
Tom Hedderson's PC Party biography

1954 births
2022 deaths
Progressive Conservative Party of Newfoundland and Labrador MHAs
21st-century Canadian politicians